The 2009 WNBA season is the tenth season for the Seattle Storm of the Women's National Basketball Association.

Offseason

Dispersal Draft 
Based on the Storm's 2008 record, they would pick 12th in the Houston Comets dispersal draft. The Storm waived their pick.

WNBA Draft 
The following are the Storm's selections in the 2009 WNBA Draft.

Transactions 
 September 10: The Storm signed A'Quonesia Franklin to an end-of-regular season contract.
 September 9: The Storm signed La’Tangela Atkinson to an end-of-regular season contract.
 June 4: The Storm waived A'Quonesia Franklin and Aja Parham.
 May 31: The Storm waived La'Tangela Atkinson and Kasha Terry.
 May 22: The Storm waived Kimberly Beck and Mara Freshour.
 May 7: The Storm signed La’Tangela Atkinson, A’Quonesia Franklin and Aja Parham to training camp contacts.
 May 7: The Storm waived Mel Thomas.
 May 4: The Storm re-signed Lauren Jackson.
 April 23: The Storm announced that Kristen O'Neill declined her offer to attend training camp.
 March 20: The Storm waived Kelly Santos.
 March 19: The Storm signed Kasha Terry and Mel Thomas.
 February 23: The Storm signed Shannon Johnson.
 February 20: The Storm signed Suzy Batkovic.
 February 10: The Storm re-signed Ashley Robinson.
 February 9: The Storm re-signed Janell Burse.
 February 2: The Storm signed Kelly Santos to a training camp contract.
 January 31: The Storm waived Sheryl Swoopes.
 January 7: The Storm re-signed free agent Tanisha Wright and signed Kimberly Beck and Kristen O'Neill to training-camp contracts.
 June 22, 2008: The Storm traded their second round pick in the 2009 WNBA Draft to the Atlanta Dream as part of the Camille Little transaction.

Free agents

Additions

Subtractions

Roster

Season standings

Schedule

Preseason 

|- align="center" bgcolor="bbffbb"
| 1 || May 21 || 10:00pm || Sacramento || 64-55 || Little (13) || Little, Walker (5) || Atkinson (4) || KeyArena  4,875 || 1-0
|- align="center" bgcolor="ffbbbb"
| 2 || May 30 || 10:00pm || @ Phoenix || 58-61 || Wright (16) || Walker (12) || Bird (4) || US Airways Center  2,421 || 1-1
|-

Regular season 

|- align="center" bgcolor="bbffbb"
| 1 || June 6 || 4:00pm || @ Sacramento ||  || 71-61 || Jackson (23) || Little (6) || Bird (8) || ARCO Arena  14,824 || 1-0
|- align="center" bgcolor="bbffbb"
| 2 || June 7 || 9:00pm || Sacramento || FSN-NW || 80-70 || Jackson (25) || Bird, Jackson, Little (5) || Bird (8) || KeyArena  9,686 || 2-0
|- align="center" bgcolor="ffbbbb"
| 3 || June 9 || 7:00pm || @ Indiana || ESPN2 || 66-73 || Jackson (21) || Jackson, Little (6) || Bird (5) || Conseco Fieldhouse  7,253 || 2-1
|- align="center" bgcolor="bbffbb"
| 4 || June 12 || 8:00pm || @ Minnesota ||  || 88-71 || Jackson (22) || Jackson (11) || Bird (9) || Target Center  6,423 || 3-1
|- align="center" bgcolor="ffbbbb"
| 5 || June 14 || 6:00pm || @ Chicago ||  || 57-64 || Jackson (22) || Jackson, Little (8) || Wright (4) || UIC Pavilion  2,681 || 3-2
|- align="center" bgcolor="bbffbb"
| 6 || June 19 || 10:00pm || Minnesota ||  || 90-62 || Jackson (26) || Jackson, Johnson (6) || Bird (10) || KeyArena  7,607 || 4-2
|- align="center" bgcolor="bbffbb"
| 7 || June 22 || 7:00pm || @ Phoenix ||  || 93-84 || Jackson (25) || Jackson (8) || Bird (9) || US Airways Center  6,181 || 5-2
|- align="center" bgcolor="bbffbb"
| 8 || June 26 || 10:00pm || Los Angeles ||  || 69-67 || Jackson (32) || Jackson, Wright (8) || Bird (5) || KeyArena  9,686 || 6-2
|- align="center" bgcolor="ffbbbb"
| 9 || June 28 || 9:30pm || @ Los Angeles || NBA TVFSNW || 55-83 || Jackson, Little (9) || Cash (8) || Johnson (3) || STAPLES Center  10,797 || 6-3
|-

|- align="center" bgcolor="ffbbbb"
| 10 || July 1 || 10:00pm || @ Phoenix ||  || 83-91 || Cash, Jackson (17) || Cash (9) || Wright (6) || US Airways Center  6,341 || 6-4
|- align="center" bgcolor="bbffbb"
| 11 || July 7 || 3:00pm || San Antonio ||  || 66-53 || Cash (18) || Cash, Jackson (12) || Bird (3) || KeyArena  10,137 || 7-4
|- align="center" bgcolor="bbffbb"
| 12 || July 9 || 9:00pm || Sacramento || ESPN2 || 66-55 || Cash (18) || Bird, Cash, Jackson, Wright (5) || Wright (7) || KeyArena  6,838 || 8-4
|- align="center" bgcolor="ffbbbb"
| 13 || July 12 || 9:00pm || Chicago || NBA TVFSN-NW || 81-86 || Jackson, Wright (18) || Jackson, Wright (7) || Wright (7) || KeyArena  6,796 || 8-5
|- align="center" bgcolor="ffbbbb"
| 14 || July 15 || 10:00pm || Detroit || NBA TVFSN-NW || 63-66 || Little (12) || Little (6) || Bird (6) || KeyArena  6,821 || 8-6
|- align="center" bgcolor="bbffbb"
| 15 || July 17 || 10:00pm || @ Sacramento ||  || 69-56 || Bird (20) || Little (9) || Bird (6) || ARCO Arena  6,386 || 9-6
|- align="center" bgcolor="bbffbb"
| 16 || July 19 || 8:00pm|| Minnesota || FSN-NW || 72-69 || Little (18) || Cash (9) || Bird, Johnson, Wright (4) || KeyArena  6,912 || 10-6
|- align="center" bgcolor="bbffbb"
| 17 || July 22 || 10:00pm || Los Angeles ||  || 98-87 (3OT) || Bird (23) || Little (14) || Bird, Cash (5) || KeyArena  7,154 || 11-6
|- align="center" bgcolor="ffbbbb"
| 18 || July 28 || 8:00pm || @ San Antonio || KMYS || 71-74 || Jackson (19) || Cash (11) || Bird (5) || AT&T Center  5,382 ||11-7
|-

|- align="center" bgcolor="bbffbb"
| 19 || August 1 || 10:00pm || San Antonio || NBA TVKMYS || 85-82 (OT) || Jackson (23) || Jackson (13) || Bird (5) || KeyArena  8,167 || 12-7
|- align="center" bgcolor="ffbbbb"
| 20 || August 4 || 10:00pm || Phoenix ||  || 90-101 (OT) || Wright (25) || Cash, Jackson (11) || Wright (7) || KeyArena  6,728 || 12-8
|- align="center" bgcolor="ffbbbb"
| 21 || August 6 || 10:30pm || @ Los Angeles ||  || 75-79 (OT) || Jackson (21) || Cash (8) || Bird, Wright (6) || STAPLES Center  9,735 || 12-9
|- align="center" bgcolor="bbffbb"
| 22 || August 8 || 10:00pm || New York ||  || 70-69 || Jackson (21) || Jackson (9) || Bird (6) || KeyArena  7,496 || 13-9
|- align="center" bgcolor="ffbbbb"
| 23 || August 13 || 7:00pm || @ Connecticut ||  || 53-64 || Wright (13) || Jackson (10) || Bird (3) || Mohegan Sun Arena  6,983 || 13-10
|- align="center" bgcolor="ffbbbb"
| 24 || August 15 || 7:00pm || @ Atlanta ||  || 79-88 || Jackson (25) || Jackson (9) || Bird (12) || Philips Arena  8,751 || 13-11
|- align="center" bgcolor="bbffbb"
| 25 || August 18 || 7:30pm || @ Detroit ||  || 79-75 || Jackson (36) || Cash, Jackson (7) || Bird (8) || Palace of Auburn Hills  7,392 || 14-11
|- align="center" bgcolor="bbffbb"
| 26 || August 22 || 10:00pm || Indiana ||  || 74-60 || Bird (16) || Cash (9) || Bird, Wright (5) || KeyArena  8,273 || 15-11
|- align="center" bgcolor="bbffbb"
| 27 || August 25 || 10:00pm || Washington ||  || 78-68 || Burse (14) || Little (7) || Wright (6) || KeyArena  6,791 || 16-11
|- align="center" bgcolor="bbffbb"
| 28 || August 27 || 10:00pm || Connecticut ||  || 86-74 || Bird (21) || Little (10) || Bird (7) || KeyArena  5,688 || 17-11
|- align="center" bgcolor="bbffbb"
| 29 || August 29 || 10:00pm || Atlanta ||  || 91-84 (2OT) || Wright (25) || Little (15) || Bird (8) || KeyArena  9,089 || 18-11
|-

|- align="center" bgcolor="bbffbb"
| 30 || September 1 || 7:00pm || @ New York ||  || 65-58 || Little (17) || Little (13) || Wright (3) || Madison Square Garden  8,469 || 19-11
|- align="center" bgcolor="ffbbbb"
| 31 || September 3 || 10:00pm || @ Washington ||  || 67-78 || Bird (17) || Cash (7) || Bird (6) || Verizon Center  10,648 || 19-12
|- align="center" bgcolor="ffbbbb"
| 32 || September 5 || 10:00pm || @ Minnesota || NBA TVFSN-N || 68-76 || Wright (20) || Little (8) || Johnson, Wright (4) || Target Center  8,170 || 19-13
|- align="center" bgcolor="ffbbbb"
| 33 || September 10 || 10:00pm || Phoenix  ||  || 84-92 (OT) || Wright (24) || Burse, Little (9) || Wright (5) || KeyArena  9,089 || 19-14
|- align="center" bgcolor="bbffbb"
| 34 || September 12 || 9:00pm || @ San Antonio ||  || 64-55 || Johnson (16) || Little (11) || Johnson (5) || AT&T Center  10,153 || 20-14
|-

| All games are viewable on WNBA LiveAccess

Postseason 

|- align="center" bgcolor="ffbbbb"
| 1 || September 16 || 10:00pm || @ Los Angeles || ESPN2 || 63-70 || Cash (24) || Batkovic-Brown (7) || Bird, Wright (5) || STAPLES Center  7,919 || 0-1
|- align="center" bgcolor="bbffbb"
| 2 || September 18 || 10:00pm || Los Angeles || NBA TV || 75-74 || Cash (18) || Wright (6) || Wright (9) || KeyArena  8,854 || 1-1
|- align="center" bgcolor="ffbbbb"
| 3 || September 20 || 5:00pm || Los Angeles || ESPN2 || 64-75 || Cash (21) || Cash (10) || Cash (3) || KeyArena  8,159 || 1-2
|-

Regular Season Statistics

Player Statistics

Team Statistics

Awards and honors 
 Lauren Jackson was named WNBA Western Conference Player of the Week for the week of June 22, 2009.
 Sue Bird was named WNBA Western Conference Player of the Week for the week of July 20, 2009.
 Sue Bird was named WNBA Western Conference Player of the Week for the week of August 24, 2009.
 Sue Bird was named to the 2009 WNBA All-Star Team as a Western Conference starter.
 Swin Cash was named to the 2009 WNBA All-Star Team as a Western Conference starter.
 Lauren Jackson was named to the 2009 WNBA All-Star Team as a Western Conference starter.
 Lauren Jackson was named to the All-WNBA First Team.
 Lauren Jackson was named to the All-Defensive First Team.
 Tanisha Wright was named to the All-Defensive First Team.

References

External links 
 Official Site

Seattle Storm seasons
Seattle
2009 in sports in Washington (state)